Igor Magazinik is an Israeli-Belarusian entrepreneur and businessman of Jewish-Russian descent. He is known as the CTO and co-founder of Viber

Magazinik was born in Nizhny Novgorod. At age 16, he moved to Israel. Upon graduating university, he worked as a programmer and served 3 years in the Army. With Talmon Marco, he founded his first start-up (now defunct) iMesh.

References 

Israeli military personnel
Living people
Israeli financial businesspeople
Year of birth missing (living people)